The Academy Honorary Award – instituted in 1950 for the 23rd Academy Awards (previously called the Special Award, which was first presented at the 1st Academy Awards in 1929) – is given annually by the Board of Governors of the Academy of Motion Picture Arts and Sciences (AMPAS). Since 2009, it has been presented at the separate annual Governors Awards rather than at the regular Academy Awards ceremony. The Honorary Award celebrates motion picture achievements that are not covered by existing Academy Awards, although prior winners of competitive Academy Awards are not excluded from receiving the Honorary Award.

Unless otherwise specified, Honorary Award recipients receive the same gold Oscar statuettes received by winners of the competitive Academy Awards.  Unlike the Special Achievement Award instituted in 1972, those on whom the Academy confers its Honorary Award do not have to meet "the Academy's eligibility year and deadline requirements".

Like the Special Achievement Award, the Special Award and Honorary Award have been used to reward significant achievements of the year that did not fit in existing categories, subsequently leading the Academy to establish several new categories, and to honor exceptional career achievements, contributions to the motion picture industry, and service to the Academy.

Recipients
Years for which the Special Award and Honorary Award recipients received their awards and the annual Academy Awards ceremonies at which they received them provided within parentheses throughout (as pertinent) follow this information for recipients listed in the Official Academy Award Database and Web-based official AMPAS documents.

Bob Hope was honored on four separate occasions.

1920s

1930s

1940s

1950s

1960s

1970s

 * (Posthumous)

1980s

1990s

2000s

2010s

2020s

Notes

See also 

 Academy Juvenile Award
 Governors Awards
 Irving G. Thalberg Memorial Award

References 

 "Academy Award Statistics".  Official Academy Awards Database.  Accessed July 28, 2008.
 "Honorary Award".  Academy of Motion Picture Arts and Sciences, oscars.org (official website).  Accessed July 28, 2008.  (2 pages.)
 "Honorary Awards: Special Awards and Honorary Awards".  Searchable Awards Database.  Official Academy Awards Database.  Accessed July 28, 2008.

External links 
 Academy of Motion Picture Arts and Sciences – Official Website.
 The Official Academy Awards Database.

Honorary Award
Lifetime achievement awards